Open Slavery existed in Qatar until the 1950s. Slavery was formally abolished in Qatar in 1952.

History

In the 1890s, the British Empire gained control of Qatar. However, the British did not interfere with the inner policy of the state, but was content with keeping peace with the indigenous power holders, protecting British citizens, and managing the contacts with the international community, in which they assured that Qatar obeyed the same international treaties signed by the British themselves.

Slave trade
During the Omani Empire (1692-1856), Oman was a center of the Zanzibar slave trade. Slaves were trafficked from the Swahili coast of East Africa via Zanzibar to Oman. From Oman, the slaves were exported to the rest of the Arabian Peninsula and Persia, including the Trucial States, Qatar, Bahrain and Kuwait. The Omani slave trade from Africa started to shrink in the late 19th-century. 

A second route of slave trade existed, with people from both Africa and East Asia, who were smuggled to Jeddah in the Arabian Peninsula in connection to the Muslim pilgrimage, Hajj, to Mecca and Medina. Victims were tricked to perform the journey willingly in the belief that they were going on the Hajj pilgrimage, or employed as servants, and then sold upon arrival. These slaves were then exported from the Hejaz to Oman, the Trucial States, Qatar, Bahrain and Kuwait.

In the 1940s, a third slave trade route was noted, in which Balochis from Balochistan were shipped across the Persian Gulf, many of whom had sold themselves or their children to escape poverty.  In 1943, it was reported that Baloch girls were shipped via Oman and the Trucial States to Mecca, where they were popular as concubines, since Caucasian girls were no longer available, and were sold for $350-450.

Function
Female slaves were used as domestic servants and as concubines (sex slaves), while male slaves were primarily used within the pearl industry as pearl divers.

Activism against slave trade

The British Empire, having signed the 1926 Slavery Convention, was obliged to fight slavery and slave trade in all land under direct or indirect control of the British Empire. Since Qatar were formally under British control, the British were expected to enforce this policy in the region. Officially, the British declared that they did just that, but in reality, the slavery and slave trade was tolerated by the British. 

The British considered their control over the region insufficient to do something about the slavery and the slave trade. The British policy was therefore to assure the League of Nations that Qatar followed the same anti slavery treaties signed by the British, but in parallel prevent any international observations of the area, which would disprove these claims. 

In both 1932 and 1935, the British colonial authorities refused to interfere in the slavery of the Trucial States, Qatar, Bahrain and Kuwait, since they were afraid that they could lose control over the area if they should attempt to enforce a policy against slavery, and they therefore prevented all international observations of the area which could force them to take action.  

In 1935, the British authorities thus assured the League of Nations that with the exception of Kuwait, all the British controlled states by the Persian Gulf, such as the Trucial States, Qatar and Bahrain, had banned the slave trade due to treaties with the British, but while at the same time, the British refused any international inspections in the region which would have revealed that a substantional slave trade was in fact going on, especially within the pearl fish industry, were the slaves were particularly harshly treated.  

In 1936, the British finally acknowledged in their rapport to the League of Nations that there was still ongoing slavery and slave trade in the Trucial States, Oman and Qatar, but claimed that it was limited; that all slaves who sought asylum at the British Agents Office in Sharjah were granted manumission and that the slave trade had stopped entirely in Kuwait and Bahrain.  In reality, the British reports were deliberately playing down the size of the actual substantional slave trade going on in the region, and refused to allow international inspection.  In the 1940s, there were several suggestions made by the British to combat the slave trade and the slavery in the region, but none was considered enforceable.

Abolition

After World War II, there was a growing international pressure from the United Nations to end the slave trade. In 1948, the United Nations declared slavery to be a crime against humanity in the Universal Declaration of Human Rights, after which the Anti-Slavery Society pointed out that there were about one million slaves in the Arabian Peninsula, which was a crime against the 1926 Slavery Convention, and demanded that the UN form a committee to handle the issue. 

Slavery was abolished in 1952. After the abolition of slavery, poor migrant workers were employed under the Kafala system, which have been compared to slavery. In August 2020 Qatar abolished the Kafala system and introduced labor reforms. Under these reforms workers can change jobs without employer’s permission and are now paid a basic minimum wage regardless of their nationality. The basic minimum wage is set at 1,000 QAR. Allowances for food and accommodation must be provided by employers, which are 300 QAR and 500 QAR respectively. Qatar introduced a wage protection system to ensure the employers are complying with the reforms. The wage protection system monitors the workers in the private sector. This new system has reduced wage abuses and disputes among migrant labours.

Modern slavery: the Kafala system

Unsolved problem 
Officially, slavery in Qatar was abolished in the middle of the last century, but the conditions in which many workers who prepare the country for the World Cup live and work look almost like slavery. Recently, migrant workers working in Qatar were allowed to change the company they work for. Previously, it was necessary to obtain an employer's permission for this. In addition, permission from the employer is required for the worker to leave the country. Without it, a foreign migrant worker simply cannot go anywhere.

In some ways, it all resembles slavery, even at the official level, only with more correct formulations.

According to the Global Slavery Index (created by the Walk Free Foundation, an international group of experts on combating slavery and human trafficking with the assistance of the Gallup research company), there are more than 30 thousand people in modern slavery in Qatar. This is one of the worst indicators in the world.

Kafala is the main wildness of modern Qatar. This is something like serfdom. According to this system, employers legally forbade foreigners to go home. To leave Qatar, people needed to get an exit visa.

In 2016, Qatar officially announced the abolition of kafala, but introduced an alternative. The employer was left with the right to decide whether to let foreign employees go home. If the employee and the authorities cannot find a compromise, the case is considered by the appeals commission.

Stadium construction 
Qatar received the right to host the FIFA World Cup in December 2010. And already in 2012, the International Trade Union Confederation (ITUC) began receiving complaints from workers employed in the construction of facilities. By the beginning of 2013, the number of applications exceeded several thousand, after which MCP appealed to the Ministry of Labor of Qatar with a demand to deal with six contractors.

In its appeal, the Confederation of Trade Unions emphasized four types of violations: the nature of work does not correspond to what is provided for in the labor agreement; employers do not fulfill their obligations to pay wages; employers withdraw passports from employees; employees are forced to live in overcrowded labor camps and are deprived of the right to form trade unions.

In response to these accusations, the Qatari authorities promised to increase the number of inspectors at the 2022 World Cup facilities by 25% (their number was supposed to exceed 300 people), and the then president of the International Football Federation (FIFA) Joseph Blatter said that the situation with labor rights will be discussed at a meeting of the executive committee of the organization in early October 2013.

For the first time, The Guardian newspaper reported not just about rights violations, but also about deaths on construction sites for the World Cup in February 2014. The article claimed that in three years out of 2 million migrant workers, up to 4,000 workers could die from unbearable conditions and insecurity. The publication also reported which workers from which countries most often stay to work in Qatar — for example, immigrants from India make up 22% of the total number of people employed at the World Cup facilities, a similar share falls on Pakistan. About 16% of the workers are from Nepal, 13% from Iran, 11% from the Philippines, 8% from Egypt and 8% from Sri Lanka.

See also

 Kafala system
 Human_rights_in_Qatar#Slavery
 History of slavery in the Muslim world
 History of concubinage in the Muslim world
 Human trafficking in the Middle East

References

 Joel Quirk: The Anti-Slavery Project: From the Slave Trade to Human Trafficking
 Jerzy Zdanowski:  Speaking With Their Own Voices: The Stories of Slaves in the Persian Gulf
 C.W.W. Greenidge:  Slavery
 William Clarence-Smith: Islam and the Abolition of Slavery

Islam and slavery
Qatar
Qatar
Social history of Qatar